McCoy House is a historic home located at Lewistown, Mifflin County, Pennsylvania, across from the Mifflin County Courthouse.  It was built between 1836 and 1843, and is a -story, brick and frame dwelling in the Federal style.  It has a gable roof and a double chimney linked at the base.  Frank Ross McCoy was born in the house in 1874.

It was added to the National Register of Historic Places in 1973.

McCoy House is now owned by the Mifflin County Historical Society and serves as a museum of local history.

References

External links
  McCoy House - Mifflin County Historical Society

Houses on the National Register of Historic Places in Pennsylvania
Federal architecture in Pennsylvania
Houses completed in 1843
Houses in Mifflin County, Pennsylvania
Museums in Mifflin County, Pennsylvania
History museums in Pennsylvania
1843 establishments in Pennsylvania
National Register of Historic Places in Mifflin County, Pennsylvania